The 1978 NBA World Championship Series was the championship round of the National Basketball Association (NBA)'s 1977–78 season, and the culmination of the season's playoffs. The series featured the Western Conference champion Seattle SuperSonics against the Eastern Conference champion Washington Bullets. The Bullets defeated the SuperSonics in seven games to win their first NBA championship. Bullets power forward/center Wes Unseld was named MVP of the series. Before the Cleveland Cavaliers' Game 7 win at Golden State in the 2016 NBA Finals, this was the last time a road team had won Game 7 in the NBA Finals. The 1978 World Championship Series was the first NBA Finals series since the 1958 World Championship Series in which both teams had under 50 wins, and is the only NBA Finals to feature two teams with under 50 wins in an 82-game season.

Background

Seattle SuperSonics

The Seattle SuperSonics had a disappointing start to the season, going 5–17 to begin with. Bob Hopkins, who replaced former Boston Celtics center Bill Russell as coach, was fired and Lenny Wilkens returned for a second tour of duty. The Sonics were led by center Jack Sikma, forwards Fred Brown, Paul Silas and John Johnson, and guards Dennis Johnson and Gus Williams. With Wilkens' experience being a key factor, the Sonics turned their season around, finishing with 47 wins and the fourth seed in the West. In the playoffs, they defeated the Los Angeles Lakers in a three-game miniseries, then upset the top-seeded and defending champion Portland Trail Blazers (who lost center Bill Walton in the second game of the series) in six games, before a six-game win over the Denver Nuggets in the Conference Finals sent them to their first of back-to-back NBA Finals appearances.

Washington Bullets

The Bullets kept some of the personnel from that 1975 team, including All-Stars Wes Unseld and Elvin Hayes, but Dick Motta was now in his second year of coaching duty. The Bullets struggled with injuries during the season, but managed to finish with 44 wins, good for the third seed in the East. In the playoffs, the Bullets disposed the Atlanta Hawks in a two-game first round series, then ousted the San Antonio Spurs in six games, before making the finals again with a six-game win over the defending Eastern Conference champion Philadelphia 76ers.

From a KENS-TV Spurs broadcast in the San Antonio series after Washington took a 3-1 lead, Motta adopted the expression "The 'opera' isn't over 'til the fat lady sings" to warn Bullets fans against braggadocio. Motta also used an upbeat ostinato, "Wait for the fat lady!", to encourage the fans.

Road to the Finals

Regular season series
Washington won the regular season series 3–1.

Series summary

Bullets win series 4–3

Game summaries

Game 1

The Bullets, behind Kevin Grevey's 27 and Elvin Hayes's 21 points, held a 19-point lead in the fourth quarter at the Seattle Center Coliseum. But, the Sonics staged a comeback in front of the home crowd, led by "instant offense" guard Fred Brown. Brown scored 16 points in the last nine minutes to finish with 32 and give the SuperSonics the win.

Game 2

In an unusual 1-2-2-1-1 scheduling format, the next two games were played at the Capital Centre, the Bullets' home floor. Wes Unseld defended inside on Marvin Webster and Jack Sikma, pulled down 15 rebounds, and handed out five assists. This work enabled Bob Dandridge to score 34 points and Elvin Hayes 25 as the Bullets evened the series, winning their first NBA Finals game following nine consecutive losses.

Game 3

Dennis Johnson was superb on defense, blocking seven shots and holding Kevin Grevey to 1-for-14 shooting. Paul Silas, the SuperSonics' veteran leader off the bench, helped shut down the Bullets' big men.

With 10 seconds remaining and the SuperSonics leading 93-90, Johnson's inbounds pass was stolen by Tom Henderson, who scored to make it 93-92 with five seconds left. Silas then stepped on the baseline trying to make the subsequent inbounds pass, turning the ball over to the Bullets. Bob Dandridge missed at the buzzer, however, and the SuperSonics picked up a victory on the road.

Game 4

Game 4 was held in the Seattle Kingdome because the Seattle Center Coliseum was tied up with a mobile-home show. As a result, the Bullets had to contend with a then-record playoff crowd of over 39,000 fans.

The SuperSonics led by 15 with two minutes left in the third quarter. At this point, the Bullet guards, who had been victimized all series by Gus Williams and emerging star Dennis Johnson, started to assert themselves, especially reserves Charles Johnson and Larry Wright.

At the start of the final period, Dennis Johnson was elbowed hard in the ribs and left the game for a short time. With Charles Johnson, Wright, Mitch Kupchak and Bob Dandridge in the lineup, the Bullets stormed back and took a 103-101 lead with about 3.5 minutes left in the game. Dennis Johnson then returned and went on a barrage, scoring first to tie the game, blocking a Dandridge shot, getting an offensive rebound, and pushing the Sonics to a 104-103 lead with a foul shot. Johnson would finish with 33 points, seven rebounds and three blocks.

Dandridge answered with a three-point play that returned the lead to Washington, 106-104. Seattle got the ball back and tied it with "instant offense" Fred Brown's jumper from "downtown". With two seconds left, Dandridge got a good shot in the lane, only to have Johnson block it, forcing overtime. But then, Charles Johnson became an instant hero by hitting three quick shots in overtime to give the Bullets a 120-116 win. The Bullets had tied the series at two wins apiece.

Game 5

The SuperSonics returned to the Seattle Center Coliseum and eked out a close win. "Downtown" Freddie Brown had 26 points and Dennis Johnson 24 to carry Seattle to a 98-94 win and the series lead. The Bullets lost it at the line, making only 9 of 20 free throws in the second half. Even so, they cut Seattle's 11-point lead to two with less than two minutes to go before Jack Sikma hit three free throws down the stretch.

Game 6

Game 6, in Washington, was all Bullets, 117-82. With the Washington backcourt continuing to struggle, Bullets coach Dick Motta inserted Greg Ballard at forward and moved Bob Dandridge to guard, a risky move considering Dandridge had played very little guard. Ballard and Dandridge produced a run that gave the Bullets a 12-point lead at the half. Washington scored 70 points in the second half, and the SuperSonics weren't up to that pace. Mitch Kupchak added 19 points, and Ballard had 12 points and 12 rebounds. The 35-point margin of victory was an NBA Finals record that stood until the 1998 NBA Finals Game 3 (96-54, 42 points).

Game 7

Dennis Johnson, who before the 1977-78 playoffs was a relatively unknown guard from Pepperdine University, had grown into a star in this series in front of a national TV audience. However, DJ would miss every one of his 14 shots in this game. Fellow guard Gus Williams was a bit more accurate, shooting 4-for-12. SuperSonics big men Marvin Webster scored 27 points and Jack Sikma 21 to take up the slack, and that kept it close.

With 90 seconds left, Seattle whittled the lead from 11 points down to four, but Mitch Kupchak came up with a three-point play. Fred Brown, who finished with 21 points off the bench, hit a short jumper, then Paul Silas got a tip-in to cut it to 101-99. Silas then fouled Wes Unseld, a 55-percent shooter from the line during the playoffs. He hit two free throws, and moments later Washington sealed it with a Bob Dandridge dunk, 105-99.

Charles Johnson and Dandridge each scored 19 points for the Bullets, while Elvin Hayes fouled out with 12 points, a development that brought a couple of needling questions from the writers about his past failures in the playoffs and Hayes' cheerful comeback "Whatever else they can say about me, they also got to say E's a world champion. E wears the ring." Unseld would be named Finals MVP.

After the climactic Game 7 victory, Motta celebrated with his team wearing a beer-soaked The Opera Isn't Over 'Til The Fat Lady Sings T-shirt. He said, "What made the championship so great was that we weren't supposed to win it. We came a long way. Most people didn't give us a chance, but I felt all along we could. I really did."

Player statistics

Washington Bullets

Seattle SuperSonics

Broadcasting

Television coverage

Nationwide TV coverage of the 1978 NBA finals was broadcast by CBS Sports, with Brent Musburger (All Games) on play-by-play and Rick Barry (All Games), Steve Jones (Game 1), recently retired John Havlicek (Games 2, 4 and 7), Gus Johnson (Game 3) and Keith Erickson (Games 4 and 5) on color commentary. Locally, the 1978 NBA Finals was broadcast by CBS affiliates: WTOP-TV in Washington, D.C. and KIRO-TV in Seattle, Washington.

National coverage

Nationwide radio coverage of the 1978 NBA Finals was broadcast by Mutual, with Tony Roberts on play-by-play and Hubie Brown on color commentary.

Local market coverage
The flagship stations of each station of each team carried their local play-by-play calls. In Washington, D.C., WTOP-AM carried the series, with Frank Herzog on play-by-play. In Seattle, KOMO, carried the series with Bob Blackburn on play-by-play.

Aftermath
The NBA received much criticism over the fact that the seven-game series was stretched out over 18 days, presumably for television; it remains the longest playoff series (in total number of days) ever played in any sport. (Even the 1989 World Series, interrupted for ten days by an earthquake, lasted only 15 days. However, that series ended in a sweep and, had it gone the full seven games, would have lasted 19 days).

Both teams met again in the 1979 finals, which Seattle won four games to one.

Team rosters

Washington Bullets

Seattle SuperSonics

See also
 1978 NBA Playoffs
 1977-78 NBA season

References

External links
 NBA History

National Basketball Association Finals
NBA
NBA
Finals
May 1978 sports events in the United States
June 1978 sports events in the United States
1970s in Seattle
1978 in sports in Washington, D.C.
1978 in sports in Washington (state)
Basketball competitions in Seattle